Events from the year 1662 in France.

Incumbents 
Monarch: Louis XIV

Events
 
 
 
 
 
 
 March 18 – A short-lived experiment of the first public buses (holding 8 passengers) begins in Paris.
 October 27 – Charles II of England sells Dunkirk to France for £400,000 (or 2.5 million livres).
 December 26 – Molière's play The School for Wives premieres.

Births
 

 
 January 17 – Françoise Pitel, French actor (d. 1721)
 April 26 – Marie Louise of Orléans (d. 1689)
 July 1 – Béatrice Hiéronyme de Lorraine, Abbess of Remiremont (d. 1738)
 September 1 – Louis de Carrières, French priest and Bible commentator (d. 1717)
 September 19 – Jean-Paul Bignon, French priest and man of letters (d. 1743)
 November 18 – Princess Anne Élisabeth of France (d. 1662)

Deaths
 

 
 March 20 – François le Métel de Boisrobert, French poet (b. 1592)

See also

References

1660s in France